The province of East Kalimantan in Indonesia is divided into regencies which in turn are divided administratively into districts, known as Kecamatan. The districts below include (listed separately) those which are within the new province of North Kalimantan.

The districts of East Kalimantan, with the regency (or city) each falls into, are as follows:

Anggana, Kutai Kartanegara
Babulu, Penajam Paser Utara
Balikpapan Barat, Balikpapan
Balikpapan Selatan, Balikpapan
Balikpapan Tengah, Balikpapan
Balikpapan Timur, Balikpapan
Balikpapan Utara, Balikpapan
Barong Tongkok, Kutai Barat
Batu Ampar, Kutai Timur
Batu Engau, Paser
Batu Sopang, Paser
Bengalon, Kutai Timur
Bentian Besar, Kutai Barat
Biduk Biduk, Berau
Bongan, Kutai Barat
Bontang Barat, Bontang
Bontang Selatan, Bontang
Bontang Utara, Bontang
Busang, Kutai Timur
Damai, Kutai Barat
Gunung Tabur, Berau
Jempang, Kutai Barat
Kaliorang, Kutai Timur
Karangan, Kutai Timur
Kaubun, Kutai Timur
Kelay, Berau
Kembang Janggut, Kutai Kartanegara
Kenohan, Kutai Kartanegara
Kongbeng, Kutai Timur
Kota Bangun, Kutai Kartanegara
Kuaro, Paser
Linggang Bigung, Kutai Barat
Loa Janan, Kutai Kartanegara
Loa Kulu, Kutai Kartanegara
Long Apari, Kutai Barat
Long Bagun, Kutai Barat
Long Hubung, Kutai Barat
Long Ikis, Paser
Long Iram, Kutai Barat
Long Kali, Paser
Long Masengat, Kutai Timur
Long Pahangai, Kutai Barat
Marang Kayu, Kutai Kartanegara
Maratua, Berau
Melak, Kutai Barat
Mook Manar Bulatn, Kutai Barat
Muara Ancalong, Kutai Timur
Muara Badak, Kutai Kartanegara
Muara Bengkal, Kutai Timur
Muara Jawa, Kutai Kartanegara
Muara Kaman, Kutai Kartanegara
Muara Komam, Paser
Muara Lawa, Kutai Barat
Muara Muntai, Kutai Kartanegara
Muara Pahu, Kutai Barat
Muara Samu, Paser
Muara Wahau, Kutai Timur
Muara Wis, Kutai Kartanegara
Nyuwatan, Kutai Barat
Palaran, Samarinda (City)
Pasir Balengkong, Paser
Penajam, Penajam Paser Utara
Penyinggahan, Kutai Barat
Pulau Derawan, Berau
Rantau Pulung, Kutai Timur
Samarinda Ilir, Samarinda (City)
Samarinda Seberang
Samarinda Seberang, Samarinda (City)
Samarinda Ulu, Samarinda (City)
Samarinda Utara, Samarinda (City)
Sambaliung, Berau
Samboja, Kutai Kartanegara
Sandaran, Kutai Timur
Sanga-Sanga, Kutai Kartanegara
Sangatta Selatan, Kutai Timur
Sangatta, Kutai Timur
Sangkulirang, Kutai Timur
Sebulu, Kutai Kartanegara
Segah, Berau
Sepaku, Penajam Paser Utara
Sungai Kunjang, Samarinda
Tabang, Kutai Kartanegara
Talisayan, Berau
Tanah Grogot, Paser
Tanjung Harapan, Paser
Tanjung Redeb, Berau
Telen, Kutai Timur
Teluk Bayur, Berau
Teluk Pandan, Kutai Timur
Tenggarong Seberang, Kutai Kartanegara
Tenggarong, Kutai Kartanegara
Tubaan, Berau
Waru, Penajam Paser Utara

The districts of North Kalimantan (which until 2012 formed a part of East Kalimantan), with the regency (or city) each falls into, are as follows:

Bahau Hulu, Malinau
Bunyu, Bulungan
Kayan Hilir, Malinau
Kayan Hulu, Malinau
Krayan, Nunukan
Krayan Selatan, Nunukan
Lumbis, Nunukan
Malinau Barat, Malinau
Malinau Selatan, Malinau
Malinau Utara, Malinau
Malinau Kota, Malinau
Mentarang, Malinau
Mentarang Hulu, Malinau
Nunukan, Nunukan
Nunukan Selatan, Nunukan
Peso, Bulungan
Peso Hilir, Bulungan
Pujungan, Malinau
Pulau Bunyu, Bulungan
Sebatik, Nunukan
Sebatik Barat, Nunukan
Sebuku, Nunukan
Sekatak, Bulungan
Sembakung, Nunukan
Sesayap Hilir, Tana Tidung
Sesayap, Tana Tidung
Sungai Boh, Malinau
Tanah Lia, Tana Tidung
Tanjung Palas, Bulungan
Tanjung Palas Barat, Bulungan
Tanjung Palas Tengah, Bulungan
Tanjung Palas Timur, Bulungan
Tanjung Palas Utara, Bulungan
Tanjung Palas, Bulungan
Tanjung Selor, Bulungan
Tarakan Barat, Tarakan City
Tarakan Tengah, Tarakan City
Tarakan Timur, Tarakan City
Tarakan Utara, Tarakan City

 
East Kalimantan